Mahadev Peak is a mountain peak in the vicinity of New Theed in Srinagar District of Indian administered Jammu and Kashmir. It is part of the Zabarwan Range. It is visible in most parts of Srinagar city.
It is also known as the peak of Srinagar. It is covered with snow for almost half of the year. The  Tarsar and Marsar lakes lie on the eastern side of this mountain. Other than Mahadev peak, places like Mamneth, Astanmarg, Ledwas, Burzwas, are well known among the trekkers.

Route 
It can be climbed through Faqir Gujri, near Scholars' School, Dara Theed Harwan. The trek can be both a day trek as well as a night trek with a night stay at Ledwas. The trek has moderate difficulty. We have to cross several small streams on our way to Ledwas, which is always enjoyable. Nomads can be seen grazing the cattle with their horses carrying essentials.

See also
 New Theed
 Dachigam National Park

References

Mountains of Jammu and Kashmir
Srinagar district